Zarudny's rock shrew (Crocidura zarudnyi) is a species of mammal in the family Soricidae. It is found in Afghanistan, Iran, and Pakistan.

References

Zarudny's rock shrew
Mammals of Afghanistan
Fauna of Pakistan
Zarudny's rock shrew
Taxonomy articles created by Polbot